Lawretta Ozoh (born 5 September 1990) is a Nigerian track athlete who specialises in sprinting.

Ozoh was the silver medalist in the 200 metres and was a member of the gold medal-winning Nigerian 4 x 100 metre relay team at the 2012 African Championships in Athletics.

Doping ban
In 2012 Ozoh tested positive for the anabolic steroid Stanozolol and was subsequently handed a two-year ban from sports.

References

Living people
1990 births
Nigerian female sprinters
Athletes (track and field) at the 2014 Commonwealth Games
Doping cases in athletics
Nigerian sportspeople in doping cases
Commonwealth Games medallists in athletics
Commonwealth Games silver medallists for Nigeria
African Games gold medalists for Nigeria
African Games medalists in athletics (track and field)
African Games bronze medalists for Nigeria
Athletes (track and field) at the 2015 African Games
21st-century Nigerian women
Medallists at the 2014 Commonwealth Games